Padfield is a village in the High Peak district of Derbyshire, England. The village contains five listed buildings that are recorded in the National Heritage List for England.  All the listed buildings are designated at Grade II, the lowest of the three grades, which is applied to "buildings of national importance and special interest". The listed buildings consist of houses, farmhouses and farm buildings.


Buildings

References

Citations

Sources

 

Lists of listed buildings in Derbyshire